The military dictatorship in Nigeria was a period when members of the Nigerian Armed Forces held power in Nigeria from 1966 to 1999 with an interregnum from 1979 to 1983. The military was able to rise to power often with the tacit support of the elite through coup d'états. Since the country became a republic in 1963, there has been a series of military coups in Nigeria.

Background 
The military dictatorship in Nigeria began with the coup d'état of 1966 which was planned and executed by a group of revolutionary Nigerian nationalist officers started as a small rebellion military cell under Emmanuel Ifeajuna. Major Chukwuma Kaduna Nzeogwu was the face of the coup attempt, which involved five other army majors: Timothy Onwuatuegwu, Chris Anuforo, Don Okafor, Adewale Ademoyega and Humphrey Chukwuka. It operated as a clandestine movement of junior officers during the post-independence period of 1960–1966. The plot received support from left-wing intellectuals, who rejected conservative elements in society, like the traditional establishment of Northern Nigeria and sought to overthrow the First Nigerian Republic.

Military regimes 
Major General Johnson Aguiyi-Ironsi was made the Head of the Federal Military Government of Nigeria, serving for six months before being overthrown and assassinated in the 1966 Nigerian counter-coup.

Aguiyi-Ironsi was succeeded by General Yakubu Gowon, who established a Supreme Military Council. Gowon held power until July 1975, when he was overthrown in a bloodless coup.

Brigadier (later General) Murtala Mohammed succeeded Gowon. Months later, in February 1976, Mohammed was assassinated by Buka Suka Dimka and others in a violent coup attempt. The plotters failed to kill Olusẹgun Ọbasanjọ, who then succeeded Mohammed as head of state. The Supreme Military Council was formally dissolved when Ọbasanjọ handed power to the elected Shehu Shagari, ending the military regime and establishing a Nigerian Second Republic.

The Second Republic was overthrown in the 1983 Nigerian coup d'état and succeeded by Muhammadu Buhari, who was established a new Supreme Military Council of Nigeria as Head of State and Commander-in-Chief of the Armed Forces. Buhari ruled for two years, until the 1985 Nigerian coup d'état, when he was overthrown by General Ibrahim Babangida.

General Ibrahim Babangida was promulgated as the President and Commander-in-Chief of the Armed Forces and established the Armed Forces Ruling Council. His rule was the longest serving in peacetime and his administration typified the military dictatorships of the 20th century. Babangida promised a return of democracy when he seized power, but he ruled Nigeria for eight years, when he temporarily handed power to the interim head of state Ernest Shonekan in 1993.

In 1993, General Sani Abacha overthrew Interim National Government and appointed himself Chairman of the Provisional Ruling Council of Nigeria.

Transition to democracy 
After Abacha's death in 1998, General Abdulsalami Abubakar took over and ruled until Olusẹgun Ọbasanjọ again became head of state (via the 1999 presidential election), ending the junta and establishing the Fourth Nigerian Republic.

See also
Nigerian First Republic
Nigerian Second Republic
Nigerian Third Republic
Nigerian Fourth Republic
Politics of Nigeria

References

Military history of Nigeria
Military dictatorships
Cold War in Africa
States and territories established in 1966
States and territories disestablished in 1979
States and territories established in 1983
States and territories disestablished in 1998